Jain vegetarianism is practised by the followers of Jain culture and philosophy. It is one of the most rigorous forms of spiritually motivated diet on the Indian subcontinent and beyond. The Jain cuisine is completely lacto-vegetarian and also excludes root and underground vegetables such as potato, garlic, onion etc., to prevent injuring small insects and microorganisms; and also to prevent the entire plant getting uprooted and killed. It is practised by Jain ascetics and lay Jains.

The objections to the eating of meat, fish and eggs are based on the principle of non-violence (ahimsa, figuratively "non-injuring"). Every act by which a person directly or indirectly supports killing or injury is seen as act of violence (himsa), which creates harmful reaction karma. The aim of ahimsa is to prevent the accumulation of such karma. The extent to which this intention is put into effect varies greatly among Hindus, Buddhists and Jains. Jains believe nonviolence is the most essential religious duty for everyone (ahinsā paramo dharmaḥ, a statement often inscribed on Jain temples). It is an indispensable condition for liberation from the cycle of reincarnation, which is the ultimate goal of all Jain activities. Jains share this goal with Hindus and Buddhists, but their approach is particularly rigorous and comprehensive. Their scrupulous and thorough way of applying nonviolence to everyday activities, and especially to food, shapes their entire lives and is the most significant hallmark of Jain identity. A side effect of this strict discipline is the exercise of asceticism, which is strongly encouraged in Jainism for lay people as well as for monks and nuns. Out of the five types of living beings, a householder is forbidden to kill, or destroy, intentionally, all except the lowest (the one sensed, such as vegetables, herbs, cereals, etc., which are endowed with only the sense of touch).

Practice

For Jains, vegetarianism is mandatory. In 2021 it was found that 92% of self-identified Jains in India adhered to some type of vegetarian diet and another 5% seem to try to follow a mostly vegetarian diet by abstaining from eating certain kinds of meat and/or abstaining from eating meat on specific days. In the Jain context, Vegetarianism excludes all animal products except dairy products.  Food is restricted to that originating from plants, since plants have only one sense ('ekindriya') and are the least developed form of life, and dairy products. Food that contains even the smallest particles of the bodies of dead animals or eggs is unacceptable. Some Jain scholars and activists support veganism, as they believe the modern commercialised production of dairy products involves violence against farm animals. In ancient times, dairy animals were well cared for and not killed. According to Jain texts, a śrāvaka (householder) should not consume the four maha-vigai (the four perversions) – wine, flesh, butter and honey; and the five udumbara fruits (the five udumbara trees are Gular, Anjeera, Banyan, Peepal, and Pakar, all belonging to the fig genus). Lastly, Jains should not consume any foods or drinks that have animal products or animal flesh. A common misconception is that Jains cannot eat animal-shaped foods or products. As long as the foods do not contain animal products or animal flesh, animal shaped foods can be consumed without the fear of committing a sin. 

Jains go out of their way so as not to hurt even small insects and other tiny animals, because they believe that harm caused by carelessness is as reprehensible as harm caused by deliberate action. Hence they take great pains to make sure that no minuscule animals are injured by the preparation of their meals and in the process of eating and drinking.

Traditionally Jains have been prohibited from drinking unfiltered water. In the past, when stepwells were used for the water source, the cloth used for filtering was reversed, and some filtered water poured over it to return the organisms to the original body of water. This practice of jivani or bilchavani is no longer possible because of the use of pipes for water supply. Modern Jains may also filter tap water in the traditional fashion and a few continue to follow the filtering process even with commercial mineral or bottled drinking water.

Jains make considerable efforts not to injure plants in everyday life as far as possible. Jains accept such violence only in as much as it is indispensable for human survival, and there are special instructions for preventing unnecessary violence against plants. Strict Jains do not eat root vegetables, such as potatoes, onions, roots and tubers, as they are considered ananthkay. Ananthkay means one body, but containing infinite lives. A root vegetable, such as potato, though from the looks of it is one article, is said to contain infinite lives in it. Also, tiny life forms are injured when the plant is pulled up and because the bulb is seen as a living being, as it is able to sprout. Also, consumption of most root vegetables involves uprooting and killing the entire plant, whereas consumption of most terrestrial vegetables does not kill the plant (it lives on after plucking the vegetables or it was seasonally supposed to wither away anyway). Among Indian Jains, 67% report that they abstain from eating root vegetables. Green vegetables and fruits contain uncountable lives. Dry beans, lentils, cereals, nuts and seeds contain a countable number of lives and their consumption results in the least destruction of life. 

Mushrooms, fungi and yeasts are forbidden because they grow in unhygienic environments and may harbour other life forms.

Honey is forbidden, as its collection would amount to violence against the bees.

Jain texts declare that a śrāvaka should not cook or eat at night. According to Acharya Amritchandra's Purushartha Siddhyupaya:

Strict Jains do not consume food that has been stored overnight, as it possesses a higher concentration of micro-organisms (for example, bacteria, yeast etc.) as compared to food prepared and consumed the same day. Hence, they do not consume yoghurt or dhokla and idli batter unless they have been freshly set on the same day.

During certain days of the month and on important religious days such as Paryushana and 'Ayambil', strict Jains avoid eating green leafy vegetables along with the usual restrictions on root vegetables.

Jains do not consume fermented foods (beer, wine and other alcohols) to avoid killing of a large number of microorganisms associated with the fermenting process. 

Jains can however consume vanilla extract, as the very minuscule amount of alcohol in extract gets baked off completely in the cooking process. In addition, certain juices (apple juice, orange juice), breads/flours (via Amyloglucosidase and Saccharomyces cerevisiae) and portions of certain fruits as they ripen (bananas as they yellow, cherries, and pears) will contain a very minuscule amount of alcohol via the fructose, sucrose, and glucose sugars, similar to vanilla extract (and can be consumed by strict Jains) [reference, jaina.org].  

According to Puruṣārthasiddhyupāya:

Along with practicing total abstinence from consuming certain types of food and limiting foods that harbor the lives of many microorganisms, fasting is also important component of Jain dietary practices, Jain identity and Jain culture. However, Jain fasting exists in many forms and both ability and social status can limit the practice of fasting to some extent. In India 84% of Jains report partaking in some form of fasting.

Influence on vegetarian cuisines in India
The vegetarian cuisines of some regions of the Indian subcontinent have been strongly influenced by Jainism. These include
 Gujarati Jain cuisine
 Marwari Jain cuisine of Rajasthan
 Bundelkhandi Jain cuisine of central India
 Agrawal Jain cuisine of Delhi and Uttar Pradesh
 Marathi Jain cuisine of South Maharashtra
 Jain Bunt cuisine of Karnataka
 Kannada Jains cuisine of Karnataka
 Tamil Jains cuisine of Northern Districts of Tamil Nadu.

In India, vegetarian food is considered appropriate for everyone for all occasions. This makes vegetarian restaurants quite popular. Many vegetarian restaurants and Mishtanna sweet-shops – for example, the Ghantewala sweets of Delhi and Jamna Mithya in Sagar – are run by Jains.

Some restaurants in India serve Jain versions of vegetarian dishes that leave out carrots, potatoes, onions and garlic. A few airlines serve Jain vegetarian dishes upon prior request.

According to survey responses of Indian Jains who identified themselves as vegetarians, 92% would be unwilling to eat at a restaurant that isn't exclusively vegetarian and 89% would be unwilling to eat at the home of a friend/acquaintance who isn't a vegetarian as well.

Historical background
When Mahavira revived and reorganized the Jain community in the 6th century BCE, ahimsa was already an established, strictly observed rule. Parshvanatha, a tirthankara whom modern Western historians consider a historical figure, lived in about the 8th century BCE and founded a community to which Mahavira's parents belonged. Parshvanatha's followers vowed to observe ahimsa; this obligation was part of their caujjama dhamma (Fourfold Restraint).

In the times of Mahavira and in the following centuries, Jains criticized Buddhists and followers of the Vedic religion or Hindus for negligence and inconsistency in the implementation of ahimsa. In particular, they strongly objected to the Vedic tradition of animal sacrifice with subsequent meat-eating, and to hunting.

According to the famous Tamil classic, Tirukkuṛaḷ, which is also considered a Jain work by some scholars:
If the world did not purchase and consume meat, no one would slaughter and offer meat for sale. (Kural 256)

Some Brahmins—Kashmiri Pandits and Bengali Brahmins—have traditionally eaten meat (primarily seafood). However, in regions with strong Jain influence such as Rajasthan and Gujarat, or strong Jain influence in the past such as Karnataka and Tamil Nadu, Brahmins are strict vegetarians.  Bal Gangadhar Tilak has described Jainism as the originator of ahimsa.  He wrote in a letter:In ancient times, innumerable animals were butchered in sacrifices. Evidence in support of this is found in various poetic compositions such as the Meghaduta. But the credit for the disappearance of this terrible massacre from the Brahminical religion goes to Jainism.

See also 

 Lacto-vegetarianism
 Fruitarianism
 Veganism
 Indian cuisine
 List of diets
 Sattvic diet
 Vegetarian cuisine
 Vegetarianism and religion
 Vitalism (Jainism)
 Vegetarianism and ecology

References

Citations

Sources

External links

List of Foods that are not-Jain

 
Vegetarian dishes of India
Vegetarianism in India
Vegetarianism